Castleiney, officially Castleleiny and historically "Castlelyny", is a village in County Tipperary, Ireland. It is one half of the Roman Catholic parish of Loughmore-Castleiney. It is in the barony of Eliogarty.

It is approximately 5 km from Templemore and approximately 7 km from Loughmore. The village is sometimes known locally as The Washpen. There is a stone attesting to this fact erected in the village.
 
The village is reached from Templemore by taking the R433 road out of Templemore and turning right onto the R502, crossing the bridge over the Dublin to Cork railway and the first right onto the L3205 local road towards Castleiney village.

Sport
Loughmore–Castleiney GAA is the local Gaelic Athletic Association club.

Notable people 
Martin Stanislaus Brennan (1845-1927) - American Catholic priest and scientist known for writing books about religion and science Saint Louis, Missouri..

See also
 List of towns and villages in Ireland

References

Towns and villages in County Tipperary
Eliogarty